Beaune-la-Rolande is a commune in the Loiret department in north-central France.

History
On 28 November 1870 it was the site of a battle during the Franco-Prussian War, in which French impressionist painter Frédéric Bazille was killed.

During World War II, it was the site of the Nazi Beaune-la-Rolande internment camp, a transit and deportation center for Jews closely associated with the Pithiviers internment camp. Eighteen thousand Jews were held at Beaune-la-Rolande; most of them were transported to Auschwitz where they were murdered.

Polish artist Zber was imprisoned there from 1941 to 1942, and the composer Ralph Erwin died there.

Population

See also
Communes of the Loiret department

References

Communes of Loiret
Loiret communes articles needing translation from French Wikipedia